Vasile Tiţă (21 February 1928 – 24 June 2013) was a Romanian amateur middleweight boxer. He won a silver medal at his first major international tournament, the 1952 Olympics, losing in the final to Floyd Patterson. After that he competed at the 1953, 1955 and 1957 European championships with the best result of reaching the quarterfinals in 1955. Domestically he won seven consecutive national titles in 1951–57, six in the 71 kg and one in the 75 kg division. He died aged 85 after suffering from Alzheimer's disease for a decade.

Olympic Record
Vasile Tiţă competed in the 1952 Helsinki Olympic boxing tournament as a middleweight.  He was a silver medalist.  Here are his results:

 First Round: defeated William Bernard Tynan Duggan of Ireland by a third-round disqualification.
 Second Round: defeated Nelson de Paula Andrade of Brazil by a second-round disqualification.
 Quarterfinal: defeated Walter Sentimenti of Italy by a third-round TKO.
 Semifinal: defeated Boris Nikolov of Bulgaria on a unanimous decision.
 Final:  Lost to Floyd Patterson of the United States by a first-round knockout.

References

External links

Prisoner in the boxing ring
 Fostul mare boxer, medaliat olimpic, Vasile Tiţă a murit la vîrsta de 85 de ani

1928 births
Olympic boxers of Romania
Olympic silver medalists for Romania
Boxers at the 1952 Summer Olympics
2013 deaths
Olympic medalists in boxing
Romanian male boxers
Medalists at the 1952 Summer Olympics
Middleweight boxers